Monaragala Royal College (also known as Royal College Monaragala or Monaragala Rajakeeya Vidyalaya) is a national school in Monaragala, Sri Lanka.

History
The college was started in a small single building on 15 March 1969 called Hulandawa Nawa Kanitu Viduhala. The first principal was P. S. Ranathunga. Later the school was upgraded and renamed as Moneragala Rajakeeya Vidyalaya. The school was given the national school status and allowed to use the name of Royal College Moneragala.

See also
 List of schools in Uva Province

References

External links
 

Educational institutions established in 1969
National schools in Sri Lanka
Schools in Monaragala District
1969 establishments in Ceylon